A by-election was held for the New South Wales Legislative Assembly electorate of Lane Cove on 8 February 1975 because of the resignation of Attorney General Ken McCaw.

The Pittwater by-election was held on the same day.

Dates

Results

Ken McCaw resigned.The Labor Party did not contest the election.

See also
Electoral results for the district of Lane Cove
List of New South Wales state by-elections

References

1975 elections in Australia
New South Wales state by-elections
1970s in New South Wales
February 1975 events in Australia